Fida International is a Finnish non-governmental humanitarian organization aimed at bring hope and a better future to all nations – especially to children living in poverty. It was founded at 1927, and is rooted in christianity. Fida International is working in global missions, community development and humanitarian aid in 50 countries. Fida International is working in close co-operation with local churches and NGO partners. Fida's goal is sustainable transformation the gives marginalized and unreached people strength to overcome hopelessness, eradicate poverty and transform their communities. Fida's focus is in improving the rights of vulnerable children.

Since 2009, the Secretary General of Fida International has been Harri Hakola.

Secretary Generals 
 1950–1960: Odin Finell
 1960–1969: Tapani Kärnä
 1969–1980: Unto Kunnas
 1980–1983: Veikko Manninen
 1983–1987: Tapani Kärnä
 1987–2009: Arto Hämäläinen
 2009– Harri Hakola

References

External links
 Fida International

Development charities based in Finland
Human rights organisations based in Finland
Organisations based in Helsinki
Organizations established in 1927
Poverty-related organizations
International charities